Guillermo Jara (born October 20, 1973 in Sacramento, California) is an American former soccer forward who played four seasons in Major League Soccer.

Youth
Jara grew up in Sacramento, California, attending Christian Brothers High School where he was a 1991 Parade magazine high school all-American. Jara also played club soccer with the Tri-Valley Soccer Club. He then played four years of college soccer at University of San Diego, from 1992 to 1995. He was the Soccer America magazine Freshman of the Year when he finished second in the US in assists and tied for third in the points list. He holds the university records for both goals and assists with 51 and 48 respectively. In his senior year, he was the 1995 West Coast Conference Player of the Year and a third team all-American.

Jara is one of 22 college players to be part of the 40-40 club, having both 40 goals and 40 assists in their college career.

U-23 national team
Jara earned five caps with the United States U-23 men's national soccer team in 1994 and 1995.  However, he never played for the senior national team.

Professional
In February 1996, the Los Angeles Galaxy selected Jara in the first round (7th overall) of the 1996 MLS College Draft. While he played in twenty-one games for the Galaxy in 1996, it was mostly as a late game substitute, amassing only 811 minutes. Consequently, the Galaxy loaned him to the Sacramento Scorpions of the USISL for several games. Jara plated even less in 1997, a total of only 353 minutes. In 1998, he played one game with the Galaxy before being traded to the Tampa Bay Mutiny. The Mutiny also used him sparingly, and in July sent him to the MLS Pro-40 team for four games. Jara began the 1999 season in Tampa Bay, but was traded to the Colorado Rapids on June 14, 1999, in exchange for Steve Trittschuh. Jara played only six minutes with the Rapids before the team released him on November 24, 1999. In 2000, Jara spent the season with the San Diego Flash of the USL A-League.

References

1973 births
Living people
American soccer players
LA Galaxy players
Tampa Bay Mutiny players
Colorado Rapids players
USISL Select League players
Sacramento Scorpions players
San Diego Flash players
San Diego Toreros men's soccer players
Major League Soccer players
MLS Pro-40 players
A-League (1995–2004) players
Soccer players from Sacramento, California
United States men's under-23 international soccer players
LA Galaxy draft picks
San Jose Earthquakes non-playing staff
Association football forwards